Miłość, muzyka, mordobicie (Polish Love, music, brawl) is the third studio album of Polish punk rock band Big Cyc, released in 1992. The title is a pun on "Love, friendship, music" - slogan of the Jarocin festival which proved to be untrue because of common brawls. The song "Nowe kombinacje" was a parody of the rock group Republika, appreciated by its leader, Grzegorz Ciechowski. "Buntownik z aerozolu" and "Jak słodko zostać świrem" featured the first videos in the group's history.

Track listing
"Woody Allen"
"Czarne garnitury" (Black suits)
"Twoje glany" (Your boots)
"Promień nad głową" (A ray over the head)
"Jak słodko zostac świrem" (How sweet to be a crazy)
"Nie będziemy śpiewać po angielsku" (We will not sing in English)
"Villago, villago"
"" (New combinations) — a pastiche of Polish new wave band Republika
"Pobudka dla nieboszczyka" (Wake up call for a dead man)
"Zwiewam z budy" (I'm getting outta school; the English version was titled Fuck the School)
"Historia z koszar" (Barracks story)
"Buntownik z aerozolu" (Spray-paint rebel)
"Gdy zamawiam pierwsze piwo" (When I order the first beer)

Credits
Dżej Dżej – bass guitar, lead vocal
Dżery – drums, vocal
Piękny Roman – lead guitar, vocal
Skiba – vocal, lyrics

Additional personnel
Wojciech Koralewski – keyboards, flute
Tomasz Rakowski – harmonica, vocals

1992 albums
Big Cyc albums